Cark (sometimes Cark in Cartmel) is a village in Cumbria, England. It lies on the B5278 road to Haverthwaite (and to the A590 road) and is ½ mile north of Flookburgh, 2 miles southwest of Cartmel and 3 miles west of Grange-over-Sands.

It is in the 
historic county of Lancashire. The village is served by the Cark and Cartmel railway station on the Furness Line between Barrow-in-Furness and Lancaster.

The village used to have a water-powered cotton mill between 1785 and c1815.

Cark is ½ mile south of Holker Hall owned by Lord and Lady Cavendish.

Royal Air Force Station Cark was constructed near Flookburgh in late 1940. It was used by training and anti-aircraft co-operation units from March 1941 until closure in December 1945. After many years of disuse, it was reopened for civilian use and is the location of the North West Parachute Centre.

Notable people

 Christopher Rawlinson (1677–1733) of Carke Hall in Cartmel, antiquary
 Edith Allonby (1875-1905), writer and teacher

See also

Listed buildings in Lower Holker

References

External links

Villages in Cumbria
South Lakeland District